Somewhere in the Night is a 1946 American film noir psychological thriller film directed by Joseph L. Mankiewicz, written by Mankiewicz with Howard Dimsdale and Lee Strasberg from a short story by Marvin Borowsky, and starring John Hodiak and Nancy Guild. The supporting cast features Lloyd Nolan, Richard Conte, Josephine Hutchinson and Sheldon Leonard.

Plot
The film tells the tale of a man called George Taylor (John Hodiak), who returns home to the U.S. from fighting in World War II. He is suffering from amnesia, having been badly injured by a grenade. Among his personal items is a letter, cursing him for some unknown wrong he committed against the letter writer.  He chooses not to admit to his lack of knowledge, concerned he will hate himself. 

Demobilized into Los Angeles, he retrieves his duty bag, in which is a letter advising him that an account has been opened in his name in a local bank, with a considerable sum, by "Your friend, Larry Cravat." The bank tells him to wait, while they make a phone call, when he asks to withdraw funds. 

The bathhouse with the stationery used by Larry Cravat has never heard of him, but the worker suggests he try asking at a bar around the corner.  When he does that, the bartender tells two muscular men about his inquiry about Cravat, and they begin to pursue him.  

Fleeing them, he stumbles into the dressing room of the singer Christy Smith (Nancy Guild), who leaves the room to fetch the nightclub bouncer.  

Once alone in the room, Taylor finds that a friend has written a postcard to Christy, announcing her impending marriage to Larry Cravat. He leaves by the window.  

Back at his hotel, he is accosted by a streetwalker, Phyllis (Margo Woode), whose attentions he declines. A phone call from the bartender at the nightclub informs him that Larry Cravat is known; but when he arrives, he is seized by a gangster (Fritz Kortner) who has him beaten for hours, asking him to divulge where Larry Cravat might be.  

Because the postcard in his pocket has Christy Smith's address, the thugs drop him at her apartment.  She cares for him, and invites Mel Phillips (Richard Conte), the proprietor of the bar, to interview Taylor. Phillips arranges his police friend (Lloyd Nolan) to explain to Taylor and Christy, as well as himself, why Larry Cravat is so notorious. It is a murder mystery involving Nazi loot.

Cast 

 John Hodiak as George W. Taylor
 Nancy Guild as Christy Smith
 Lloyd Nolan as Police Lt. Donald Kendall
 Richard Conte as Mel Phillips
 Josephine Hutchinson as Elizabeth Conroy
 Fritz Kortner as Anzelmo aka Dr. Oracle
 Margo Woode as Phyllis
 Sheldon Leonard as Sam
 Lou Nova as Hubert
 Whit Bissel as bartender not credited

Production notes
20th Century Fox purchased Marvin Borowsky's original, unpublished story "The Lonely Journey" and his accompanying screenplay in December 1944 for $11,000. Somewhere in the Night was Nancy Guild's first film. Production Dates: 21 Nov 1945–24 Jan 1946.

A radio version of the film, starring John Hodiak and Lynn Bari, was broadcast on Lux Radio Theatre on March 3, 1947.

Reception

When the film was first released, film critic Bosley Crowther gave the film a negative review, writing "Lloyd Nolan, Richard Conte, Josephine Hutchinson and several others are competent as varied pawns. Their performances are interesting; it's only too bad that they have such turbid and inconclusive things to do. After a while, the mad confusion of the story inspires a complete apathy."

More recently, film critic Dennis Schwartz praised the film, writing "A dark moody noir tale about a marine who gets blown up by a grenade in the South Pacific during a skirmish in WW-II and survives, only to become an amnesia victim...Mankiewicz does a nice job of creating the dark noir mood. The film is spiced up with comedy, excellent performances, plenty of suspense, plus a tense voice-over by John Ireland, and it manages to keep the pot boiling with a quintessential amnesiac story."

References

External links

 
 
 
 
 
 Somewhere in the Night information site and DVD review at DVD Beaver (includes images)

Streaming audio
 Somewhere in the Night on Lux Radio Theatre: March 3, 1947 at My Old Radio

1946 films
1940s crime thriller films
American black-and-white films
1940s English-language films
Film noir
Films about amnesia
Films directed by Joseph L. Mankiewicz
Films scored by David Buttolph
Films with screenplays by Joseph L. Mankiewicz
20th Century Fox films
American crime thriller films
1940s American films